Dragan Despot (born 14 July 1956) is a Croatian actor. He has appeared in more than twenty films since 1979.

Despot graduated from the Academy of Dramatic Art at the University of Zagreb, where his teacher was Tonko Lonza in 1981. In 1983 he joined Croatian National Theatre in Mostar and the same year performed at the Dubrovnik Summer Festival. Prior to acting, Despot was a fan of football and loved watching players such as Dušan Bajević, Enver Marić, Franjo Vladić and especially Slaven Zambata. Despite his love for football, he pursued career in acting instead and joined such people as Ivica Vidović, Rade Šerbedžija, Jakov Sedlar, Pero Kvrgić, Mladen Budišćak, Žarko Potočnjak, Duško Valentić, Matko Elezović, Zijad Grčić, Zlatko Vitez and Matko Raguž. Despot is married to Anja Šovagović-Despot, an actress, and together they have a son Josip and daughter Ana.

He voiced Rico in the Croatian dub of Home on the Range (2004).

Selected filmography

References

External links

1956 births
Living people
Croats of Bosnia and Herzegovina
Croatian male film actors
Actors from Mostar
Academy of Dramatic Art, University of Zagreb alumni